Nicarchides from Pydna, son of Simus, was a general of Alexander the Great. In 331/0 he was appointed phrourarchos of Persepolis and placed in charge of a garrison of 3,000 men . Nicarchides was also trierarch of the Hydaspes fleet of Nearchus.

References
Who's who in the age of Alexander the Great: prosopography of Alexander's empire  by Waldemar Heckel 

Phrourarchs of Alexander the Great
Trierarchs of Nearchus' fleet
Ancient Pydnaeans
4th-century BC Macedonians